José Pinheiro (born 20 August 1938) is a Portuguese fencer. He competed in the individual and team épée events at the 1968 Summer Olympics.

References

External links
 

1938 births
Living people
Portuguese male épée fencers
Olympic fencers of Portugal
Fencers at the 1968 Summer Olympics
Sportspeople from Lisbon